Anegola Kikkeri is a small village in Mandya District of Karnataka state, India.

Location
Anegola Kikkeri is located between Kikkeri and Channarayapatna towns on Mysore-Arsikere Road.

Postal code
There is a post office in the village and the Pin Code is 571423.

Gallery

References

Villages in Mandya district